Angel Krstev (born December 15, 1980) is a Czech professional ice hockey defenceman who currently plays for Lukko of the Finnish SM-liiga.

External links

Living people
1980 births
Avtomobilist Yekaterinburg players
Czech ice hockey defencemen
Färjestad BK players
HC Bílí Tygři Liberec players
HC Kometa Brno players
HC Litvínov players
HC Slavia Praha players
HC Sparta Praha players
HC Stadion Litoměřice players
HC Vítkovice players
IHC Písek players
Lethbridge Hurricanes players
Motor České Budějovice players
Piráti Chomutov players
Sportovní Klub Kadaň players
Ice hockey people from Prague
Torpedo Nizhny Novgorod players
Czech expatriate ice hockey players in Canada
Czech expatriate ice hockey players in Russia
Expatriate ice hockey players in Italy
Czech expatriate sportspeople in Italy
Czech expatriate ice hockey players in Sweden
Czech people of Bulgarian descent